Gay New York: Gender, Urban Culture, and the Making of the Gay Male World, 1890–1940 is a 1994 history book by George Chauncey about gay life in New York City during the early 20th century. An updated 2019 edition commemorates the Stonewall Rebellion's 50th anniversary.

References

Further reading

External links 

 
 Full text via the Internet Archive

1994 non-fiction books
English-language books
Gay history
Historiography of LGBT in New York City
History books about the United States
History books about the 20th century
Basic Books books
1990s LGBT literature